16S rRNA pseudouridine516 synthase (16S RNA pseudouridine516 synthase, 16S PsiI516 synthase, 16S RNA Psi516 synthase, RNA pseudouridine synthase RsuA, RsuA, 16S RNA pseudouridine 516 synthase) is an enzyme with systematic name 16S rRNA-uridine516 uracil mutase. This enzyme catalyses the following chemical reaction

 16S rRNA uridine516  16S rRNA pseudouridine516

The enzyme is specific for uridine516 in 16S rRNA.

References

External links 
 

EC 5.4.99